Robin Franklin, FRS is a British cell biologist and neuroscientist. He is currently a Principal Investigator at Altos Labs Cambridge Institute of Science having previously been Professor of
Stem Cell Medicine at the Wellcome–MRC Cambridge Stem Cell Institute at the University of Cambridge.  He is Emeritus Fellow of Pembroke College, Cambridge.

Education 
Robin Franklin was educated at the Haberdashers' Aske's School, Elstree. He was awarded a Bachelor of Science degree from UCL in 1985 and a Bachelor of Veterinary Medicine from the Royal Veterinary College, University of London in 1988. He received his PhD in neuroscience from the University of Cambridge in 1992.

Research and career 
Franklin is a pioneer in the biology of remyelination, an area where he has made many seminal contributions. These include, 1) identifying the role of the innate immune response, 2) the effects of ageing and how these can be reversed, 3) the activation and plasticity of CNS stem cells following injury (including the origin of the remyelinating cells of the CNS), 4)
the transcriptional and epigenetic control of CNS stem cell differentiation; and 5) the first demonstrations of remyelination by transplanted oligodendrocyte progenitor cells and olfactory ensheathing cells. His studies on RXR and metformin in the context of CNS remyelination have led to clinical trials.

Awards and honours 
2006: Elected Fellow of Royal College of Pathologists
2018: Elected Fellow of Royal College of Veterinary Surgeons
2016: Elected Fellow of Academy of Medical Sciences
2022: Elected Fellow of the Royal Society
2004: Cavanagh Prize of the British Neuropathological Society
2017: Barancik Prize – International Prize for Research innovation, National Multiple Sclerosis Society
2021: King Faisal Prize for Medicine

References

External links 

Living people
Cell biologists
British biologists
Professors of the University of Cambridge
Fellows of the Royal Society
1962 births